Huntsville is a former community in Jackson County, West Virginia.

References 

Ghost towns in West Virginia
Geography of Jackson County, West Virginia